Lexer is a German surname. Notable people with the surname include:

Erich Lexer, German physician
Gottfried Lexer, Austrian luger
Josef Lexer, Austrian luger
Matthias von Lexer, German lexicographer
Ryan Lexer (born 1976), American-Israeli basketball player

German-language surnames